Pandanus solms-laubachii, commonly known as swamp pandan, is a plant in the family Pandanaceae endemic to northeastern Queensland. It is closely related to both Pandanus gemmifer and Pandanus grayorum.

References

External links
 
 
 View a map of historical sightings of this species at the Australasian Virtual Herbarium
 View observations of this species on iNaturalist
 View images of this species on Flickriver

solms-laubachii
Endemic flora of Queensland
Taxa named by Ferdinand von Mueller
Plants described in 1887